Route 252 or Highway 252 may refer to:

Canada
 Manitoba Provincial Road 252
 Nova Scotia Route 252

Costa Rica
 National Route 252

Japan
 Japan National Route 252

United States
 Arkansas Highway 252
 California State Route 252 (former)
 Georgia State Route 252
 Indiana State Road 252
 Iowa Highway 252 (former)
 K-252 (Kansas highway)
  Kentucky Route 252
 Minnesota State Highway 252
 Montana Secondary Highway 252
 New Mexico State Road 252
 New York State Route 252
 New York State Route 252A
 Ohio State Route 252
 Pennsylvania Route 252
 South Carolina Highway 252
 Tennessee State Route 252
 Texas State Highway Loop 252
 Texas State Highway 252 (former)
 Farm to Market Road 252 (Texas)
 Utah State Route 252
 Virginia State Route 252
 West Virginia Route 252
 Wyoming Highway 252
Territories:
 Puerto Rico Highway 252